Big Top Pee-wee is a 1988 American comedy film directed by Randal Kleiser. A stand-alone sequel to Pee-wee's Big Adventure (1985), the film stars Paul Reubens as Pee-wee Herman with Susan Tyrrell, Kris Kristofferson, Penelope Ann Miller, and Valeria Golino in supporting roles. The original music score is composed by Danny Elfman (although he also scored Pee-wee's Big Adventure, he could not use any themes from that film due to contractual restrictions). It was released on July 22, 1988, and grossed $15 million against a $20 million dollar budget. A stand-alone sequel, Pee-wee's Big Holiday, was released in 2016.

Plot
Pee-wee Herman dreams of being a famous singer. He awakens and goes to work on his farm with Vance the pig. Later, he has lunch with his fiancée, school teacher Winnie Johnson. Next, he races Vance to a general store owned by Mr. Ryan to order a sandwich. There, the local Sheriff warns everyone of a large storm approaching town.

After the storm ends, Pee-wee emerges from his storm shelter to discover that an entire traveling circus has been blown into his backyard. Befriended by Cabrini Circus ringmaster Mace Montana, Pee-wee hopes to impress Gina Piccolapupula, a trapeze artist and the circus' star attraction, thereby incurring the jealousy of his relationship with Winnie until she meets Gina's older brothers, the Piccolapupula Brothers. Gina leaves Pee-wee when she finds out about Winnie, but later returns to him when she realizes that Pee-wee actually loves her after calling off his engagement with Winnie.

Pee-wee wants to join the circus, but his attempts fail. Gina then tells Pee-wee about her deceased father Papa Piccolapupula who was a famous aerialist who suffered a fall performing the Spiral of Death. Gina states that Pee-wee should try walking the tightrope in his honor. Mace comes up with a brilliant idea: to stage a three-ring spectacular saluting the American Farm. However, most of the town's residents are elderly people who have been demanding the circus leave town.

The Sheriff and Mr. Ryan lead the elderly townspeople as the Sheriff attempts to arrest Pee-wee. The Sheriff promises to dismiss the charges if the circus leaves town. While the circus is packing, Mace tells Pee-wee they will do the circus elsewhere to prevent Pee-wee from being charged. Pee-wee saves the day when he sneaks modified cocktail weenies from his hot dog tree to the townspeople, causing them to become children once again.

Without any memories of what happened, the children attend Mace's circus and watch Pee-wee perform.

Cast

Production
Following the success of the 1985 Warner Bros. film Pee-wee's Big Adventure, Paul Reubens signed a development deal with Paramount Pictures to write, produce, and/or direct additional projects for the character of Pee-wee Herman. Big Top Pee-wee was the first project in the deal to go into production.

The Paramount production was directed by Randal Kleiser and written by Paul Reubens and George McGrath. Reubens also co-produced the film with Debra Hill. Filming locations included Disney's Golden Oak Ranch in Newhall, California, and the auditorium at Hart High School in Santa Clarita. Big Top Pee-wee was Kleiser's first movie for Paramount since 1978's Grease.

During a 1988 television special, Herman acknowledged the long hours of circus training undertaken by the film's actors and that they spent a year and a half working on the movie. He also humorously compared himself as an actor to James Cagney and Spencer Tracy and ended by saying that Big Top Pee-wee is "at least as good as Police Academy."

Release and reception
On Rotten Tomatoes, the film has a 38% rating based on 21 reviews, with the site's critical consensus stating: "Its endearingly oddball lead character gives it his all, but Big Top Pee-Wee simply lacks the whimsical magic of its predecessor." Roger Ebert gave the film two stars and, along with colleague Gene Siskel, also gave it a thumbs down on their television program, At the Movies. In a comparison to previous Pee-wee works, Ebert claimed that what had made Pee-wee's Playhouse and Pee-wee's Big Adventure great was "the characters in those have absolutely no connection with reality whatsoever, and that is why they were so enduring and enjoyable". The negative reviews reflected the film's performance at the box office, where it grossed $15,122,324, suffering from competition with Who Framed Roger Rabbit, A Fish Called Wanda, and the re-issue of Bambi, among other summer releases.

References

External links

 
 
 
 
 

Pee-wee Herman
1988 films
1988 comedy films
1980s adventure comedy films
American adventure comedy films
1980s English-language films
Films directed by Randal Kleiser
Films with screenplays by Paul Reubens
Circus films
Films shot in California
American sequel films
Paramount Pictures films
Films scored by Danny Elfman
Films produced by Debra Hill
1980s American films